Cynaroside (also known as luteoloside) is a flavone, a flavonoid-like chemical compound. It is a 7-O-glucoside of luteolin.

Natural occurrences 
It can be found in Ferula varia and F. foetida in Campanula persicifolia and C. rotundifolia, in the bamboo Phyllostachys nigra, and in Teucrium gnaphalodes.

 In food
It can be found in dandelion (the highest concentration in the flowers, but also in the roots) and in Cynara scolymus (artichoke).

Metabolism 
Flavone 7-O-beta-glucosyltransferase adds a glucose to luteolin.

A cynaroside 7-O-glucosidase has been identified in the artichoke.

Spectral data

References 

Flavone glucosides
Catechols